Sergei Konstantinovitch Pankejeff (24 December 1886 – 7 May 1979) was a Ukrainian aristocrat from Odesa, Ukraine, best known for being a patient of Sigmund Freud, who gave him the pseudonym of Wolf Man (German: der Wolfsmann) to protect his identity, after a dream Pankejeff had of a tree full of white wolves.

Biography 

The Pankejeff family (Freud's German transliteration from the Russian; in English it would be transliterated as Pankeyev) was a wealthy family in St. Petersburg. Sergei attended a grammar school in Russia, but after the 1905 Russian Revolution he spent considerable time abroad studying. During his review of Freud's letters and other files, Jeffrey Moussaieff Masson uncovered notes for an unpublished paper by Freud's associate Ruth Mack Brunswick. Freud had asked her to review the Pankejeff case, and she discovered evidence that Pankejeff had been sexually abused by a family member during his childhood.

In 1906, his older sister Anna committed suicide while visiting the site of Mikhail Lermontov's fatal duel, and by 1907 Sergei began to show signs of serious depression. Sergei's father Konstantin also suffered from depression, often connected to specific political happenings of the day, and committed suicide in 1907 by consuming an excess of sleeping medication, a few months after Sergei had left for Munich to seek treatment for his own ailment. While in Munich, Pankejeff saw many doctors and stayed voluntarily at a number of elite psychiatric hospitals. In the summers, he always visited Russia.

Der Wolfsmann (The Wolf Man)

In January 1910, Pankejeff's physician brought him to Vienna to have treatment with Freud. Pankejeff and Freud met with each other many times between February 1910 and July 1914, and a few times thereafter, including a brief psychoanalysis in 1919. Pankejeff's "nervous problems" included his inability to have bowel movements without the assistance of an enema, as well as debilitating depression. Initially, according to Freud, Pankejeff resisted opening up to full analysis, until Freud gave him a year deadline for analysis, prompting Pankejeff to give up his resistances.

Freud's first publication on the "Wolf Man" was "From the History of an Infantile Neurosis" (Aus der Geschichte einer infantilen Neurose), written at the end of 1914, but not published until 1918. Freud's treatment of Pankejeff centered on a dream the latter had as a very young child which he described to Freud:

"I dreamt that it was night and that I was lying in bed. (My bed stood with its foot towards the window; in front of the window there was a row of old walnut trees. I know it was winter when I had the dream, and night-time.) Suddenly the window opened of its own accord, and I was terrified to see that some white wolves were sitting on the big walnut tree in front of the window. There were six or seven of them. The wolves were quite white, and looked more like foxes or sheep-dogs, for they had big tails like foxes and they had their ears pricked like dogs when they pay attention to something. In great terror, evidently of being eaten up by the wolves, I screamed and woke up. My nurse hurried to my bed, to see what had happened to me. It took quite a long while before I was convinced that it had only been a dream; I had had such a clear and life-like picture of the window opening and the wolves sitting on the tree. At last I grew quieter, felt as though I had escaped from some danger, and went to sleep again." (Freud 1918)

Freud's eventual analysis (along with Pankejeff's input) of the dream was that it was the result of Pankejeff having witnessed a "primal scene" — his parents having sex a tergo or more ferarum ("from behind" or "doggy style") — at a very young age. Later in the paper, Freud posited the possibility that Pankejeff instead had witnessed copulation between animals, which was displaced to his parents.

Pankejeff's dream played a major role in Freud's theory of psychosexual development, and along with Irma's injection (Freud's own dream, which launched dream analysis), it was one of the most important dreams for the developments of Freud's theories. Additionally, Pankejeff became one of the main cases used by Freud to prove the validity of psychoanalysis. It was the third detailed case study, after "Notes Upon a Case of Obsessional Neurosis" in 1908 (also known by its animal nickname "Rat Man"), that did not involve Freud analyzing himself, and which brought together the main aspects of catharsis, the unconscious, sexuality, and dream analysis put forward by Freud in his Studies on Hysteria (1895), The Interpretation of Dreams (1899), and his Three Essays on the Theory of Sexuality (1905).

Later life
Pankejeff later published his own memoir under Freud's given pseudonym and remained in contact with Freudian disciples until his own death (undergoing analysis for six decades despite Freud's pronouncement of his being "cured"), making him one of the longest-running famous patients in the history of psychoanalysis.

A few years after finishing psychoanalysis with Freud, Pankejeff developed a psychotic delirium. He was observed in a street staring at his reflection in a mirror, convinced that some sort of doctor had drilled a hole in his nose.  Ruth Mack Brunswick, a Freudian, explained the delusion as displaced castration anxiety.

Criticism of Freud's interpretation
Critics, beginning with Otto Rank in 1926, have questioned the accuracy and efficacy of Freud's psychoanalytic treatment of Pankejeff. Similarly, in the mid-20th century, psychiatrist Hervey Cleckley dismissed Freud's diagnosis as far-fetched and entirely speculative. Dorpat has suggested that Freud's behavior in the Pankejeff case as an example of gaslighting (attempting to undermine someone's perceptions of reality).

Daniel Goleman wrote the following in the New York Times:

Mária Török and Nicolas Abraham have reinterpreted the Wolf Man's case (in The wolf man's magic word, a cryptonymy), presenting their notion of "the crypt" and what they call “cryptonyms." They provide a different analysis of the case than Freud, whose conclusions they criticise. According to the authors, Pankejeff's statements hide other statements, while the actual content of his words can be illuminated by looking into his multi-lingual background. According to the authors, Pankejeff hid secrets  concerning his older sister, and as the Wolf Man both wanted to forget and preserve these issues, he encrypted his older sister, as an idealised "other" in the heart of himself, and spoke these secrets out loud in a cryptic manner, through words hiding behind words, rebuses, wordplays etc. For example, in the Wolf Man's dream, where six or seven wolves were sitting in a tree outside his bedroom window, the expression "pack of six", a "sixter" = shiestorka: siestorka = sister, which gives the conclusion that his sister is placed in the centre of the trauma.

The case forms a central part of the second plateau of Gilles Deleuze and Félix Guattari's A Thousand Plateaus, titled "One or Several Wolves?"  In it, they repeat the accusation made in Anti-Oedipus that Freudian analysis is unduly reductive and that the unconscious is actually a "machinic assemblage". They argue that wolves are a case of the pack or multiplicity and that the dream was part of a schizoid experience.

See also

Notes

References 
Whitney Davis, Drawing the Dream of the Wolves: Homosexuality, Interpretation and Freud's 'Wolf Man''' (Indianapolis: Indiana University Press, 1995), .
Sigmund Freud, "From the History of an Infantile Neurosis" (1918), reprinted in Peter Gay, The Freud Reader (London: Vintage, 1995).
"The Wolf-Man" [Sergei Pankejeff], The Wolf-Man (Pankejeff's memoirs, along with essays by Freud and Ruth Mack Brunswick), (New York: Basic Books, 1971).
James L. Rice, Freud's Russia: National Identity in the Evolution of Psychoanalysis'' (New Brunswick, NJ: Transaction Publishers, 1993), 94-98. 
Torok Maria, Abraham Nicolas, The wolf man's magic word, a cryptonymy, 1986

External links 

Freud exhibit which contains images of Pankejeff

1886 births
1979 deaths
Analysands of Ruth Mack Brunswick
Analysands of Sigmund Freud
Case studies by Sigmund Freud
Dream
People from Odesa
Russian nobility
Vasylivka, Odesa Raion
Emigrants from the Russian Empire to Austria-Hungary